Desmond Shum (）is the author of Red Roulette: An Insider’s Story of Wealth, Power, Corruption and Vengeance in Today’s China and is the former husband of arrested Chinese billionaire Duan Weihong.

Shum was born in Shanghai, spent his boyhood in Hong Kong and studied at a college in the United States.

Work 

In Red Roulette Shum describes his personal experience working in senior roles in Chinese companies and the Guanxi with people in the Chinese government and the ruling Communist Party that was required to ensure business dealings were successful. He describes the widespread and systemic corruption that permeates the Chinese Communist Party’s relationship with private business and the resulting high level of influence the party and the government exercise on private business.
In the book Shum considers Guo Wengui a dissident; admits having been member of Chinese People’s Political Consultative Conference for a decade; and confesses to marching against Hong Kong’s Umbrella Movement in 2014 but switching sides in 2019. Shum credits his co-fellow at Aspen Institute, Bill Browder, and his book “Red Notice” as inspirations.

60 Minutes 
Desmond Shum was interviewed on 60 Minutes by Liam Bartlett where he outlined his former wife's (and his own) corrupt connections with Wen Jiabao, his wife Zhang Peili, Wang Qishan and Li Peiying (executed for corruption in 2009). He alleged that their mutually beneficial relationship allowed both parties, and other well connected party members, to amass billions of dollars of wealth until they fell out of favor with the government when Xi Jinping began consolidating power and commencing his well-publicized fight against corruption in the Chinese Communist Party. It was at this point that Desmond's ex-wife went missing and was later discovered to have been held by China’s security agencies.

References

 

Chinese writers
Living people
Year of birth missing (living people)